Fluctus is a small genus of east Asian corinnid sac spiders. It was first described by C. Jin and F. Zhang in 2020, and it has only been found in China.  it contains only two species: F. bannaensis and F. tengchongensis.

See also
 List of Corinnidae species

References

Corinnidae genera
Spiders of China